Pargny may refer to the following places in France:

 Bois-lès-Pargny, Aisne
 Pargny, Rethel, Ardennes
 Pargny, Somme
 Pargny-Filain, Aisne
 Pargny-la-Dhuys, Aisne
 Pargny-les-Bois, Aisne
 Pargny-lès-Reims, Marne
 Pargny-sous-Mureau, Vosges
 Pargny-sur-Saulx, Marne